The Iron Mountains are a subrange of the Blue Ridge Mountains. These mountains are located around the common meeting point of Tennessee, Virginia, and North Carolina.

A portion of the Appalachian Trail runs the crest of the Iron Mountains above Watauga Lake and the Watauga River near Elizabethton, Tennessee, and then runs northeastly by Shady Valley, Tennessee, finally ascending Holston Mountain and into Virginia. In addition, the historic Virginia Creeper Trail traverses the Iron Mountains between Damascus and Whitetop, Virginia.

See also
 Mountain City, Tennessee
 Johnson County, Tennessee
 Whitetop, Virginia
 Grayson County, Virginia
 Washington County, Virginia
 Elizabethton, Tennessee
 Carter County, Tennessee
 Roan Mountain, Tennessee

 
Blue Ridge Mountains
Mountain ranges of Virginia
Mountain ranges of Tennessee
Mountain ranges of North Carolina
Subranges of the Appalachian Mountains
Mountains of Ashe County, North Carolina
Landforms of Carter County, Tennessee
Landforms of Johnson County, Tennessee
Landforms of Sullivan County, Tennessee
Landforms of Grayson County, Virginia
Landforms of Washington County, Virginia
Landforms of Watauga County, North Carolina